The Edgar Allan "E. A." Poe House is a historic home located at Fayetteville, Cumberland County, North Carolina.

It was built between 1896 and 1898, and is a two-story, three-bay frame house with Eastlake movement / Stick Style decorative elements.  It features a wraparound porch which is double-tiered in the central bay and graced by delicate sawnwork and turned posts.

It was listed on the National Register of Historic Places in 1983.  It is located in the Haymount Historic District.

It is named after the successful businessman, politician, and civic leader who built it; not the well-known American author Edgar Allan Poe. To avoid confusion, the Fayetteville native is generally referenced as "E. A." in the local area and the historic house museum is known simply as Poe House. It is also referenced as the 1897 Poe House and part of the Museum of the Cape Fear Historical Complex.

See also
Edgar Allan Poe House (Lenoir, North Carolina)
Edgar Allan Poe Museum (disambiguation)

References

External links
Museum of the Cape Fear Historical Complex

Historic house museums in North Carolina
Houses on the National Register of Historic Places in North Carolina
Victorian architecture in North Carolina
Houses completed in 1896
Houses in Fayetteville, North Carolina
National Register of Historic Places in Cumberland County, North Carolina
Museums in Cumberland County, North Carolina
Historic district contributing properties in North Carolina
1896 establishments in North Carolina